Ryan Flamingo (born 31 December 2002) is a Dutch professional footballer who plays as a defender for Eredivisie club Vitesse, on loan from Sassuolo.

Career
He joined Vitesse Arnhem on loan in July 2022, having spent some time abroad in Italy with Sassuolo.  Prior to that switch, he had been in the youth teams with Almere City.

Flamingo made his debut in the Eredivisie on 7 August 2022, appearing as a substitute in a 5-2 defeat against Feyenoord at the GelreDome. As well as playing in defence Flamingo demonstrated versatility for Vitesse also playing in midfield against RKC Waalwijk on 27 August 2022 and scored his first professional goal in a 2-2 draw, before switching back to playing in defence the following week against FC Groningen.

International career
In March 2023, Flamingo was called up to the Dutch U21 squad for the first time.

References

2002 births
Living people
Association football defenders
Eredivisie players
Dutch footballers
Dutch expatriate footballers
Expatriate footballers in Italy
SBV Vitesse players
U.S. Sassuolo Calcio players